"Disrespectful" is a song by American recording artist Chaka Khan featuring vocals by singer Mary J. Blige. It was written by Blige along with Jimmy Jam and Terry Lewis, Bobby Ross Avila, Dave Young and Issiah J. Avila, and produced for Khan's eleventh studio album Funk This (2007). "Disrespectful" went to number one on the US dance charts. It won Khan and Blige the Grammy Award for Best R&B Performance by a Duo or Group with Vocals at the 50th Annual Grammy Awards.

Charts

Weekly charts

See also
 List of number-one dance singles of 2007 (U.S.)

References

2007 singles
Chaka Khan songs
Songs written by Jimmy Jam and Terry Lewis
Songs written by Mary J. Blige
2007 songs
Go-go songs